Aprio, LLP (previously known as Habif Arogeti and Wynne LLP (HA&W)) is an accounting firm headquartered in Atlanta, Georgia.  Based on 2021 revenue, it is one of the 100 largest firms in the United States and the fourth largest firm in the Southeastern United States.  The firm's services include audit, tax, business advisory, COVID relief assistance, outsourcing, and staffing in Finance, Accounting, and IT..  The firm serves clients in industries including as health care, insurance, manufacturing, real estate, retail, and technology and blockchain.

In 2021, it posted revenues of $171 million and employed 754 people.

History

Isaac Habif and Jimmy Arogeti created the firm in 1952.  Merrill Wynne later joined the firm in 1962, becoming a Partner in 1970.

In late 2013, the firm added commercial real estate tax consulting to its services and announced it was merging with JRZ, LLC, an Atlanta-based real estate tax firm.

In 2015, HA&W began a re-brand to the name Aprio, LLP.

Controversies
Aprio gained notoriety in the Georgia court case Lechter v. Aprio, in which the firm was accused of racketeering.

Many of Aprio's clients have complained in Google Reviews that the firm drags projects out over multiple years, resulting in IRS late fees.

For more than five years, Aprio has provided Bitcoin and crypto services to clients, touting these offerings on Aprio.com. Despite the crises in Crypto, Aprio continues to facilitate Bitcoin and Crypto transactions.

References

6. "Investor seeks $4 million; alleges fraud, negligence." Wall, Michael. Atlanta Business Chronicle. 11/15/99.

7. "Investors seek $13 million in stock dispute." Molis, Jim and Michael Wall. Atlanta Business Chronicle. 11/15/99.

8. "Doctor says friendship led him to invest with broker." Molis, Jim. Atlanta Business Chronicle. 11/15/99.

External links
 

Accounting firms of the United States